Geoffrey Stewart is a male former swimmer who competed for England.

Swimming career
Stewart represented England and won a bronze medal in the 4 x 100 metres freestyle relay, at the 1986 Commonwealth Games in Edinburgh, Scotland.

References

English male swimmers
Swimmers at the 1986 Commonwealth Games
Commonwealth Games medallists in swimming
Commonwealth Games bronze medallists for England
Medallists at the 1986 Commonwealth Games